Slavičín is a town in Zlín District in the Zlín Region of the Czech Republic. It has about 6,200 inhabitants.

Administrative parts
Villages of Divnice, Hrádek na Vlárské dráze and Nevšová are administrative parts of Slavičín.

Geography

It lies in the Vizovice Highlands, on the Říka stream.

History
The first written mention of Slavičín is from 1141. For centuries, it was mostly an agricultural village where the craft did not flourish much. In 1860 a tannery was founded here, which was later expanded by a shoe factory. In 1936, an engineering company was established and Slavičín became an industrial village. After the World War II Slavičín further expanded, and in 1964 it became a town.

Demographics

Sights
The cemetery Church of Saint Adalbert is the oldest building in the town. The original church was from the 13th century. After it was destroyed by a fire, it was completely rebuilt in the Baroque style in 1897.

The Slavičín Castle was built in the Baroque style in 1750. Today it serves as a restaurant.

Notable people
Lumír Krejčí (born 1972), biochemist
Tomáš Řepka (born 1974), footballer
Tomáš Polách (born 1977), footballer
Lenny Trčková (born 1978), presenter and model
Petra Polášková (born 1979), footballer
Stanislav Polčák (born 1980), politician
Aleš Urbánek (born 1980), footballer
Zdeněk Hřib (born 1981), politician, Mayor of Prague

Twin towns – sister cities

Slavičín is twinned with:
 Horná Súča, Slovakia
 Horné Srnie, Slovakia
 Nová Dubnica, Slovakia
 Uhrovec, Slovakia

References

External links

Cities and towns in the Czech Republic
Populated places in Zlín District